Monroe Public Schools is a public school district in Monroe, Michigan, United States.  It is the largest school district in Monroe County in terms of enrollment.  In addition to serving the city of Monroe, the district also encompasses much of Monroe Charter Township and portions of Frenchtown Charter, Exeter, Raisinville, and La Salle townships.

Schools

Elementary schools
Arborwood Elementary Campus
Arborwood South Elementary School
Arborwood North Elementary School
Custer 1 Elementary School
Custer 2 Elementary School
Manor Elementary School
Raisinville Elementary School
Waterloo Elementary School

Secondary schools
Monroe Middle School
Monroe High School
MCMC (Monroe County Middle College) 
Orchard Center High School (alternative school)

Specialized learning centers
Knabusch Mathematics and Science Center
Riverside Early Learning Center

References

External links

 Monroe Public Schools

School districts in Michigan
Monroe, Michigan
Education in Monroe County, Michigan